James Richard Haskell was an American inventor chiefly remembered for his invention (with Azel S. Lyman) of a multi-charge gun which was intended to increase muzzle velocity by detonating additional propellant charges behind the projectile or shell as it moved up the gun's barrel and was a distant ancestor of the World War II German V-3 "supergun".

In 1854 Haskell began experiments with steel breech-loading rifled cannon and breech-loading small-arms, manufacturing 25 of the former, which were purchased by the Mexican Government.

In 1855 he began experimenting with multi-charge guns in partnership with Azel S. Lyman, who originated the idea of applying successive charges of gunpowder to accelerate the velocity of a projectile.

Rafael Repeater
In 1862, with a French inventor named George Raphael (sometimes reported as Rafael), a supplier of revolvers and swords to the Union army, Haskell invented and constructed a rapid-firing machine gun which became known as the Rafael Repeater. It was mounted on a light artillery carriage and fired standard rifle bullets. Unlike contemporary machine-guns, it did not use a feed hopper or separate cartridge chambers. However, few details remain of how it worked, apart from a mention in a letter from John Ericsson:

Rafael secured a meeting with Abraham Lincoln thanks to a letter of introduction from New York governor Edwin D. Morgan and in turn Lincoln arranged that the gun be tested by John A. Dahlgren who did so at the Navy Yard, discovering that the gun's range and accuracy were remarkable. As far as rate of fire went, the gun fired 40 shots in 20 seconds. John Ericsson was impressed, and wrote to Lincoln that

The Repeater was tested in April 1863 at the 6th Corps headquarters in Virginia and was praised by a board composed of two Brigadier-Generals and a Colonel. In their report they stated that they found its simple construction, accuracy, range and rate of fire exactly as had been claimed for it and recommended that initially eight to twelve guns be used per brigade. Brigadier General Pratt, whose experience in action with the Gatling gun had not been satisfactory, endorsed the Rafael Repeater in glowing terms and asked that at least 24 of them be issued to his division.

After reading the report, Abraham Lincoln asked the Secretary of War to refer it to the Bureau of Ordnance. However, General James Wolfe Ripley, who was notorious for delaying the introduction of repeating rifles, did not buy a single example of the gun.

Multi-charge gun
Haskell and Lyman reasoned that subsidiary propellant charges, spaced at intervals up the barrel of a gun in side chambers and ignited an instant after a shell had passed them, could increase the muzzle velocity of a projectile. The result, the "Lyman-Haskell multi-charge gun", which they constructed on the instructions of the US Army's Chief of Ordnance, did not resemble a conventional artillery piece; the barrel was so long that it had to be laid on an inclined ramp, and it had pairs of chambers angled back at 45 degrees let into it. It was test fired at the Frankfort Arsenal at Philadelphia in 1880 and was unsuccessful; due to faulty obturation, the flash from the original propellant charge bypassed the projectile and prematurely ignited the subsidiary charges. Lyman and Haskell abandoned the idea, though it was apparently briefly raised again in Britain during World War I.

Colonel Haskell died at his home in Passaic, New Jersey on August 16, 1897.

Notes

References

 

Firearm designers
19th-century American inventors
People from Passaic, New Jersey
1843 births
1897 deaths